Craig Davies (born 26 May 1957) is an Australian field hockey player. He competed at the 1984 Summer Olympics in Los Angeles, where the Australian team placed fourth. He also participated at the 1988 Summer Olympics in Seoul, where the Australian team again placed fourth.

References

External links

1967 births
Living people
Australian male field hockey players
Olympic field hockey players of Australia
Field hockey players at the 1984 Summer Olympics
Field hockey players at the 1988 Summer Olympics